Ackner is a surname. Notable people with the surname include:

 Johann Michael Ackner (1782–1862), Transylvanian archaeologist and nature researcher
 Desmond Ackner, Baron Ackner (1920–2006), British judge and Lord of Appeal in Ordinary

German-language surnames
Jewish surnames

de:Ackner